Adam Charlap Hyman (born 1989) is an American designer and artist. He is the co-founder and partner of Charlap Hyman & Herrero, an architecture and design firm based out of New York City and Los Angeles. His grandfather is pianist and composer Dick Hyman.

Education 
Hyman graduated from the Rhode Island School of Design (RISD) in 2011 with a BFA in Furniture Design and Art History.

Career
From 2010 to 2011, Charlap Hyman was a fellow of the Rhode Island School of Design Museum, where he worked as a Conservation Assistant and a Curatorial Assistant. In September 2011, he worked for Polo Ralph Lauren as a Furniture Design Consultant. In his 4 years at Ralph Lauren Home, Charlap Hyman collected, researched, and archived historical reference material.

In October 2014, Charlap Hyman and his fellow RISD classmate Andre Herrero co-founded Charlap Hyman & Herrero, an architecture and design firm. Charlap Hyman runs the office in New York City, while Herrero runs the office in Los Angeles. Charlap Hyman & Herrero works internationally for a range of clients and industries, producing architecture, interior design, product design, furniture design, and fine art. Adam's brother, Alexander, works for the company running the business side of the operation.

Adam Charlap Hyman was listed in the 'Art & Style' Forbes 30 Under 30 list in 2018.

References 

1989 births
Living people
Rhode Island School of Design alumni
American designers